Venelina Veneva-Mateeva (née Veneva, born June 13, 1974 in Ruse) is a Bulgarian high jumper.

Biography
Talented at a young age, she jumped 1.93 metres indoor in 1990 to record a world best performance by a 15-year-old. She did not improve this result outdoor until 1995 (1.94 m). A disappointing 1996 season with a 29th place at the Olympic Games and 1.88 as season best was followed by a jump of 2.03 metres in 1998. In 2001, she managed 2.04 m, the ninth highest jump for a woman. That year she won a bronze medal at the World Indoor Championships, as well as placing fourth at the outdoor World Championships.

Veneva tested positive for testosterone in January 2007, and was subsequently suspended for two years by the IAAF.

Achievements

Notes:
(q) Indicates overall position in qualifying round.
(#) Indicates height achieved in qualifying round. Only shown when superior to result in final.
(3rd) Originally won the bronze medal at 2007 European Indoor Championships before being disqualified for a doping offence.

See also
Female two metres club
List of sportspeople sanctioned for doping offences

References

External links

1974 births
Living people
Bulgarian female high jumpers
Athletes (track and field) at the 1996 Summer Olympics
Athletes (track and field) at the 2000 Summer Olympics
Athletes (track and field) at the 2004 Summer Olympics
Olympic athletes of Bulgaria
Doping cases in athletics
Bulgarian sportspeople in doping cases
Athletes (track and field) at the 2012 Summer Olympics
European Athletics Championships medalists
Sportspeople from Ruse, Bulgaria
World Athletics Championships athletes for Bulgaria
21st-century Bulgarian women